A list of films produced in Pakistan in 1978 (see 1978 in film) and in the Urdu language:

1978

See also
1978 in Pakistan

External links
 Search Pakistani film - IMDB.com

1978
Pakistani
Films